Akpaka Airport  is an airport serving Atakpamé, the capital city of the Plateaux Region in Togo.

Facilities
It has one runway  in length.

References

External links
 
 

Airports in Togo
Plateaux Region, Togo